The 2007 FC Spartak Moscow season was the club's 16th season in the Russian Premier League season. Spartak finished the season in 2nd position for the second year in a row, qualifying for the 2008–09 UEFA Champions League Third Qualifying Round. In the 2006–07 Russian Cup reached the semifinal before being knocked out by Lokomotiv Moscow, whilst in the 2007–08 Russian Cup they were knocked out at the Round of 32 stage by Terek Grozny.
In Europe, Spartak were knocked out of the UEFA Cup by Celta Vigo before being knocked out of the 2007–08 UEFA Champions League by Celtic in the Third Qualifying Round.

Season events
Vladimir Fedotov    Stanislav Cherchesov

Squad

On loan

Left club during season

Transfers

In

Loans in

Out

Loans out

Released

Competitions

UEFA Cup

Knockout stages

Premier League

Results by round

Results

League table

Russian Cup

2006-07

2007-08

UEFA Champions League

Qualifying rounds

Squad statistics

Appearances and goals

|-
|colspan="16"|Players away from the club on loan:

|-
|colspan="16"|Players who appeared for Spartak Moscow but left during the season:
|}

Goal scorers

Clean sheets

Disciplinary record

References

FC Spartak Moscow seasons
Spartak Moscow